This is an incomplete list of Statutory Rules of Northern Ireland in 1978.

 Babies' Dummies (Safety) Regulations (Northern Ireland) 1978 S.R. (N.I.) 1978/322

Statutory Rules
1978 in law
1978
Northern Ireland Statutory Rules